The Kert campaign was a conflict in northern Morocco between Spain and insurgent Riffian harkas led by Mohammed Ameziane, who had called for a jihad against the Spanish occupation in the eastern Rif. It took place between 1911 and 1912.

History 
The campaign saw the introduction of the tropas regulares indígenas ("native regular troops"), created by Dámaso Berenguer on 30 June 1911.

The campaign followed a revolt initiated by Mohammed Ameziane, caïd of Segangan, who had called for a jihad and had attacked both Spanish and tribes friendly to them. After an attack on a group of Spanish military personnel undertaking topographic works at a position near Ishafen (near the river Kert) the Spanish campaign formally started on 24 August. A Spanish column had been however already shot on 30 June.

Following a visit to Melilla, Spanish War Minister Agustín Luque took control of the operations on 7 October, and the struggles brought numerous losses to both sides, 64 death and 204 wounded on the Spanish side. On 14 October 1911 General Salvador Díaz Ordóñez was killed in action and a column commanded by  had 33 deaths and 105 wounded.

The Spanish forces took the position of Al Aaroui (Monte Arruit) on 18 January 1912.

The Spanish ended the campaign following the killing of Ameziane by native regulares on 15 May 1912. The Spanish losses by that time amounted to about 500 killed and 1,900 wounded. The Spanish control line was extended to the Kert River and the new boundaries for the Spanish-occupied territory entailed the annexation of the Berber cabiles of Ait Sidel and Ait Bu-Gafar.

See also 

 Tetuán War
 First Melillan campaign
 Second Melillan campaign

Citations and references

Citations

References 
 
 
 
 
 
 
 

Kert campaign
Wars involving Spain
Wars involving Morocco
Conflicts in 1911
Conflicts in 1912
Rif
African resistance to colonialism